Kichino is a rural locality (a village) in Zheleznodorozhnoye Rural Settlement, Sheksninsky District, Vologda Oblast, Russia. The population was 30 as of 2002.

Geography 
Kichino is located 12 km west of Sheksna (the district's administrative centre) by road. Antipino is the nearest rural locality.

References 

Rural localities in Sheksninsky District